"Down Town Mystery" (Japanese: ダウン・タウン・ミステリー; stylized as DOWN TOWN MYSTERY) is the first single by Carlos Toshiki & Omega Tribe, released by VAP on March 9, 1988. The single peaked at #8 on the Oricon charts.

Background 
After Mitsuya Kurokawa left 1986 Omega Tribe due to health issues, and the band renamed themselves to "Carlos Toshiki & Omega Tribe" with three members.

The "Night Time" version was mixed by Kunihiko Shimizu, who was in charge of recording and mixing engineer for songs in the 1986 era, while the "Daylight" version was mixed by Eiji Uchinuma, who was newly appointed in this work. The plan to announce these two versions was planned by Koichi Fujita, the president and producer of the band's affiliated office, and thought it would be good to have separate record studios used for mixing.

During the recording stages of the single and album, Kurokawa participated with the band as well as the band's fourth tour that started in 1987. The tour was scheduled to end on January 31, 1988, but four performances were postponed due to singer Carlos Toshiki's illness. The single was released and it was announced that Kurokawa left the band.

Kurokawa also participated in the Iwate Prefectural Hall performance on March 4, 2014.

Single 
On March 16, 1991, at Nisshin Power Station, the song was played after the most at the end of the live performance at is this song, it has become a song was last played as a band up to now. After the crowd wanted an encore, even after Toshiki stated that they're wouldn't be any more songs played, the song was played even though it was not scheduled.

A promotional video was produced for the single. This promotion video shows only two places where Carlos and a female model are in the same place. The female model looks back at Carlos after two people with an umbrella pass each other, and a female model walks, however, the scene where Carlos looks down from a high place. Carlos and a woman are shown on one screen at the same time only in the PV of this song, and Carlos and a woman also appear in "Toki wa Kagerō " where all the members and a female model appear, but together It was never reflected. Originally, there were two types of costumes for female models of this song, but the first costume was too transparent, and the other costume had too many body lines, so it was decided to make two costumes and they arranged and used in a hurry.

A TV commercial was also produced, with the daylight version being used for the single commercial and the nighttime version being used for the album commercial. The commercial of the album was recorded on the DVD of the box set released at a later date.

Charts

References 

1988 songs
Omega Tribe (Japanese band) songs